Tokiwa, usually written , , or , may refer to:

Places
Tokiwa, Fukushima, a town in the north of Japan's main island
Tokiwa, Aomori, a village in the far north of Japan's main island

Colleges and universities
Tokiwa Junior College, Mito, Ibaraki
Tokiwa University, Mito, Ibaraki
Tokiwakai Gakuen University, Osaka
Kobe Tokiwa College, Kobe

Stations
Tokiwa Station (Yamaguchi), Ube, Yamaguchi
Iwaki-Tokiwa Station, Tamura, Fukushima
Kai-Tokiwa Station, Minobu, Yamanashi
Kita-Tokiwa Station, Fujisaki, Aomori
Shinano-Tokiwa Station, Ōmachi, Nagano

Other uses
Tokiwa (name)
Tokiwa-sō, an apartment building
, several ships
 Tokiwa (train), a Japanese train service